This article lists all the films and television specials based on Monster High, an American fashion doll and media franchise created by Garret Sander, illustrated by Kellee Riley and Glen Hanson and launched by Mattel on June 11, 2010.

These films and television specials were broadcast on Nickelodeon in the United States and released on home video formats by Universal Pictures Home Entertainment until 2017. In 2016, Mattel rebooted the franchise with the release of an origin story film special titled "Welcome to Monster High", using updated animation modules and technologies, which released the following year. On February 23, 2021, Mattel, through its television division announced a second relaunch with an animated TV series and a live-action musical film based on the franchise, which is released on both Nickelodeon and Paramount+ in the United States in October 2022.

First-generation (2D) films (2010–2011) 
Animation for the films/specials below were provided by WildBrain Entertainment with additional animation provided by Top Drawn Animation.

First-generation (3D) films (2012–2016) 
Animation for this generation was produced by Nerd Corps Entertainment until 2016 and the Vancouver studio subsidiary of DHX Media thereafter for the last 2 films due to DHX's acquisition of Nerd Corps.

Second-generation films (2016–2017) 
In 2016, the series was rebooted with updated character designs, origin stories and upgraded animation modules and technologies. Animation provisions for this generation were taken over by a United Kingdom-based animation studio known as "Flaunt Productions/Studios".

Third-generation films (2022–present) 
On February 23, 2021, Mattel, through its television division, announced an animated TV series and a live-action musical film based on the franchise.

Cancelled films

Notes

References 

Monster High
Monster High
Films based on fashion dolls
Films based on Mattel toys